Stratherrick is a strath situated above the south-eastern shore of Loch Ness, in the Scottish Highlands, Scotland. Much of the strath is covered by Loch Mhòr. This is a generally shallow loch, which acts as a reservoir for the Foyers hydro electricity scheme.

The area has a number of small settlements, these include Whitebridge, Gorthleck, Aberchalder and Errogie. Stratherrick Primary School is in Gorthleck. There is a Catholic church, Immaculate Conception Parish Church, Stratherrick near Whitebridge.

References

Populated places in Inverness committee area
Glens of Scotland
Valleys of Highland (council area)